Velestino railway station is a railway station in Velestino in Thessaly, Greece. It is located outside the settlement. The station is situated at a junction Volos–Kalambaka and Volos–Larissa lines. The station is close to the E06 Motorway.

History
The station was opened on 22 April 1884 by the Thessaly Railways (now part of OSE). The line was designed by the Italian Evaristo de Chirico, (father of Giorgio de Chirico) soon after the liberation of Central Greece from the Ottomans. The station stood at a junction Volos–Kalambaka and Volos–Larissa lines (it must be noted the current line to Larissa followed a different alignment). The station also housed a large maintenance depot to the north, which now lies underused and overgrown. In 1960 the line from Larissa to Volos was converted to standard gauge and connected at Larissa with the mainline from Athens to Thessaloniki, allowing OSE to run through services to Volos from Athens and Thessaloniki. In 1955 Thessaly Railways was absorbed into Hellenic State Railways (SEK). In 1960 the line from Larissa to Volos was converted to standard gauge and connected through Larissa to the mainline from Athens to Thessaloniki, allowing OSE to run through services to Volos from Athens and Thessaloniki. Volos station was converted to dual gauge in order to accommodate trains of the two branches. Parts of the station and the track towards the city centre were at this period of a unique triple-gauge system: standard gauge for Larissa trains, metre gauge for Kalambaka trains and  gauge for Pellon trains. In 1970 OSE became the legal successor to the SEK, taking over responsibilities for most of Greece's rail infrastructure.

In 2001 the infrastructure element of OSE was created, known as GAIAOSE; it would henceforth be responsible for the maintenance of stations, bridges and other elements of the network, as well as the leasing and the sale of railway assists. In 2005, TrainOSE was created as a brand within OSE to concentrate on rail services and passenger interface. In July 2022, the station began being served by Hellenic Train, the rebranded TranOSE The move was welcomed by the mayor of Serres, Alexandros Chrysafis.

In 2009, with the Greek debt crisis unfolding OSE's Management was forced to reduce services across the network. Timetables were cut back, and routes closed as the government-run entity attempted to reduce overheads. In 2017 OSE's passenger transport sector was privatised as TrainOSE, currently a wholly owned subsidiary of Ferrovie dello Stato Italiane infrastructure, including stations, remained under the control of OSE.

Facilities
The old station still stands but is not in regular use; as of (2021) the station is unstaffed, with no staffed booking office and just simple bus-like waiting rooms. the original track aliment has been moved, so access to the platforms is via crossing the lines. The platforms have no outside seating, Dot-matrix display departure and arrival screens or timetable poster boards for passenger information. The station remains little more than an unstaffed halt. However, the station has parking facilities.

Services
Today, the town is served by direct lines to the rest of Greece via Larissa and is directly linked with Athens once per day, with Thessaloniki twice per day, and with Larissa 15 times a day. There is also a direct service to Volos and the ferries.

The station was also the starting point of the Velestino-Kalampaka  line until its closure in 1999.

References

External links
 Velestino Station - National Railway Network Greek Travel Pages

Transport in Magnesia (regional unit)
Railway stations in Thessaly
Railway stations opened in 1884
Buildings and structures in Magnesia (regional unit)
Thessaly Railways